The 1970 NAIA Division I football season was the 15th season of college football sponsored by the NAIA. It was also the first of twenty-seven seasons that the NAIA split its football competition into two separate championships.

The season was played from August to November 1970 and culminated in the 1970 NAIA Champion Bowl, played on December 12, 1970 at Sirrine Stadium in Greenville, South Carolina.

Texas A&I defeated  in the Champion Bowl, 48–7, to win their third NAIA national title.

Conference realignment

Membership changes

Conference standings

Postseason

See also
 1970 NAIA Division II football season
 1970 NCAA University Division football season
 1970 NCAA College Division football season

References

 
NAIA Football National Championship